Chester Evans Finn Jr. (born August 3, 1944) is a former professor of education, an educational policy analyst, and a former United States Assistant Secretary of Education. He is currently the president emeritus of the nonprofit Thomas B. Fordham Foundation in Washington, D.C. He is also a Fellow of the International Academy of Education, an Adjunct Fellow at the Hudson Institute, and a senior fellow at Stanford University's Hoover Institution  where he chairs the Koret Task Force on K-12 Education. He was also a member of the Maryland Kirwan Commission on Education during its authorization period from 2016 to 2019.

Finn was Professor of Education and Public Policy at Vanderbilt University (1981–2002).  He served as Assistant Secretary for Research and Improvement at the U.S. Department of Education (1985–88). Prior positions included Staff Assistant to U.S. President Richard Nixon; special assistant to Massachusetts Governor Francis Sargent (1972–73); counsel to U.S. Ambassador to India Daniel Patrick Moynihan (1973–74); Research Associate at the Brookings Institution (1974–77); and legislative director for U.S. Senator Daniel Patrick Moynihan (1977–81).

Memberships
American Educational Research Association
Committee for the Free World
Phi Delta Kappa

Published works
How to Educate an American: The Conservative Vision for Tomorrow's Schools; Michael J. Petrilli and Chester E. Finn Jr., eds. (2020). West Conshohocken, PA: Templeton Press. .

We Must Take Charge!: Our Schools and Our Future (1991)
The Educated Child: A Parents Guide From Preschool Through Eighth Grade (1999; with William Bennett and John T. E. Cribb Jr.)
Charter Schools in Action: Renewing Public Education (2001; with Bruno V. Manno and Gregg Vanourek)
Leaving No Child Behind?: Options for Kids in Failing Schools (2004) (with Frederick M. Hess)
Troublemaker: A Personal History of School Reform Since Sputnik (2008)

References

External links
Thomas B. Fordham Foundation website
Hoover Institution profile
Hudson Institute > About Hudson  > Chester Finn Hudson Institute biography

MediaTransparency Profile of Chester Finn
Review of Chester Finn's Autobiography, Troublemaker: A Personal History of School Reform Since Sputnik

1944 births
Living people
Phillips Exeter Academy alumni
People from Columbus, Ohio
Reagan administration personnel
Vanderbilt University faculty
National Association of Scholars
Harvard Graduate School of Education alumni